Jean de Picquigny was a French noble from Amiens who was viceroy of Languedoc. Known for arresting Bishop Bernard Saisset in 1301 as well as freeing Inquisition prisoners in Carcassonne, along with Bernard Délicieux, in 1303. For these controversial actions, he was excommunicated in 1303.

References

1304 deaths
People from Amiens
Lords of France
Year of birth unknown